Annandale may refer to:

Places

Australia 
Annandale, New South Wales, a suburb of Sydney
Annandale, Queensland, a suburb of Townsville
Annandale Station, a cattle station in Queensland

Guyana 
Annandale, Demerara-Mahaica
Annandale, Pomeroon-Supenaam

United States 
Annandale, Pasadena, California
Annandale (Pacific Electric), railroad in this location
Annandale, Minnesota
Annandale, New Jersey
Annandale (NJT station), rail station in this location
Annandale, Virginia, census-designated place in Fairfax County, Virginia, US
Annandale-on-Hudson, New York, US
Annandale (Gilmore Mills, Virginia), a historic house
Annandale Plantation, a former plantation in Mannsdale, Mississippi, US

Elsewhere
Annandale, Dumfries and Galloway, a strath in Dumfries and Galloway, Scotland, UK
Annandale distillery, a lowland whisky distillery in Annandale, Scotland
 Annandale, Shimla, a suburb in Shimla, India
Annandale National Historic Site, Tillsonburg, Ontario, Canada

People
Robert de Brus, 1st Lord of Annandale (died 1142)
Charles Annandale (1843–1915), British editor
Nelson Annandale (1876–1924), Scottish zoologist and anthropologist

Other uses
Annandale (rugby league team), a former team in the New South Wales Rugby League competition

See also 
 Annadale (disambiguation)